A-kinase anchor protein 11 is an enzyme that in humans is encoded by the AKAP11 gene.

Function 

The A-kinase anchor proteins (AKAPs) are a group of structurally diverse proteins, which have the common function of binding to the regulatory subunit of protein kinase A (PKA) and confining the holoenzyme to discrete locations within the cell. This gene encodes a member of the AKAP family. The encoded protein is expressed at high levels throughout spermatogenesis and in mature sperm. It binds the RI and RII subunits of PKA in testis. It may serve a function in cell cycle control of both somatic cells and germ cells in addition to its putative role in spermatogenesis and sperm function.

Interactions 

AKAP11 has been shown to interact with:
 GSK3B, 
 PPP1CA, 
 PRKAR2A,
 PRKAR2B.
 VAPB. Binding is via a FFAT motif in the N-terminal portion of AKAP11, similar to that found in AKAP3.

References

External links

Further reading 

 
 
 
 
 
 
 
 
 

A-kinase-anchoring proteins